RFA Sir Galahad (L3005) was a Round Table class landing ship logistics (LSL) vessel belonging to the Royal Fleet Auxiliary of the United Kingdom.

The ship saw service in the Falklands War of 1982, where she was bombed and set afire at Fitzroy on 8 June.

Background
She was first managed for the British Army by the British-India Steam Navigation Company, before being transferred in 1970 to the RFA, and was manned by Hong Kong Chinese civilian crew.

Design and construction
The Sir Galahad was a 3,322-tonne LSL built by Stephens and launched in 1966. She could carry 340 troops or, when necessary, 534 for short periods. Cargo capacity could include 16 light tanks, 34 mixed vehicles, 122 tonnes of fuel and 31 tonnes of ammunition. Landing craft could be carried in place of lifeboats, but unloading was mainly handled by three onboard cranes.

Operational history

1970
In November and December 1970 Sir Galahad was involved in Operation Burlap giving humanitarian assistance to East Pakistan after a cyclone caused extensive damage and flooding.

Falklands War and loss 
Sir Galahad was a part of the British task force during the Falklands War, sailing from HMNB Devonport on 6 April 1982, with 350 Royal Marines.

The vessel entered San Carlos Water, East Falkland, on 21 May. Three days later, on 24 May, Sir Galahad was attacked by a formation of strike aircraft –  McDonnell Douglas A-4 Skyhawks and IAI Daggers – of the Argentine Air Force's IV Brigada Aérea. Lieutenant Luis Alberto Cervera, in a Skyhawk, dropped a British-pattern 1,000 pound (450 kg) bomb that lodged inside the ship, but did not detonate. The ship was also hit by cannon fire from the Daggers.

Royal Marine volunteers returned to the Sir Galahad to assist a Royal Navy EOD team in defusing the unexploded 1,000 lb bomb, physically carrying the bomb through to the rear tank deck ramp, where it was placed in an inflatable boat – filled with packets of cornflakes to act as padding – and taken out into San Carlos water where the boat was punctured and sunk.

At approximately 14:00 local time, Sir Galahad was hit by two or three bombs, which exploded and started fires. The explosions and subsequent fire caused the deaths of 48 crew and soldiers.

Following the air attack, the fires quickly began to burn out of control. The main evacuation of the injured and wounded was organised and carried out by the ship's Royal Marine detachment. The Marines organised the launch of life rafts from the bow of the ship, whilst at the same time marshaling helicopters for personnel to be winched clear. Immediate first aid was given to those most seriously wounded and a triage system set up.

BBC television cameras recorded images of Royal Navy helicopters hovering in thick smoke to winch survivors from the burning landing ships.

Other units affected included 3 Troop—of 20 Field Squadron, 36 Engineer Regiment—which was temporarily attached to 9 Independent Parachute Squadron and was being transported on the Galahad to provide engineering support following the landings. Engineers feature prominently in contemporary footage showing two lifeboats landing survivors. Also on board were 16 Field Ambulance, who assisted with the treatment and evacuation of the many casualties.

Chiu Yiu-Nam, a seaman on Sir Galahad, was later awarded the George Medal for rescuing ten men trapped by a fire in the bowels of the ship. The captain, Philip Roberts, was reportedly the last to leave Sir Galahad, and was subsequently awarded the DSO for his leadership and courage. Royal Marine Sergeant Brian Dolivera was mentioned in dispatches, related to his work on the evacuation.

After the Falklands War

On 21 June, the hulk was towed out to sea by the tug Typhoon and sunk by  using torpedoes; it is now an official war grave, designated as a protected place under the Protection of Military Remains Act.

Guardsman Simon Weston was among the survivors of the attack on Sir Galahad. He suffered 46% burns and his story has been widely reported in television and newspaper coverage. Ten years after Sir Galahad was sunk, Weston was awarded the OBE. Other survivors included the intelligence consultant Crispin Black.

A replacement ship entered service in 1988, carrying the same name and pennant number.

Notes

References
 Raymond Blackman, Ships of the Royal Navy (Macdonald and Jane's, London, 1973)
 SI 2008/0950 Designation under the Protection of Military Remains Act 1986
 Geoff Puddefoot, No Sea Too Rough (Chatham Publishing, London, 2007.)

External links
 Board of Inquiry report into the sinking of the Sir Galahad
 Helicopter goes from Falklands hero to paintball prop

Galahad (L3005)
Ships built on the River Clyde
1966 ships
Welsh Guards
Falklands War naval ships of the United Kingdom
Maritime incidents in 1982
Ships sunk as targets
Shipwrecks of the Falklands War
Protected Wrecks of the United Kingdom
Ships sunk by Argentine aircraft